Scott Ellis is a director.

Scott Ellis may also refer to:

Scott Ellis (cricketer)
Scott Ellis (actor) in The Miserables
Scott Ellis (drummer) in She Wants Revenge
Scott Ellis (sailor) in Laser World Championships
Scott Ellis (soccer), player for Kalamazoo Outrage

See also